PennWest Edinboro is a campus of Pennsylvania Western University, a multi-campus public university in Pennsylvania. Located in the town of Edinboro, the campus has more than 4,600 enrolled students.

History 

Edinboro University was founded as the Edinboro Academy, a private training school for Pennsylvania teachers in 1857, by the region's original Scottish settlers. It is the oldest training institution west of the Allegheny Mountains and the second oldest in all of Pennsylvania.  In the beginning, Edinboro modestly consisted of one two-story building, six classrooms, three instructors, 110 students and a principal. That original building Academy Hall is currently used as the undergraduate admissions office. In 1861, the Edinboro Academy affiliated with the state government of Pennsylvania to become the second State Normal School in Pennsylvania, occasionally known as the Northwest State Normal School. In 1914, the state purchased the school from the original stockholders and renamed it the Edinboro State Normal School. By 1927, the advancement of academic programs to include liberal arts study required the school to rename itself Edinboro State Teachers College. Further development of the liberal arts to include degree programs outside the field of education resulted in Edinboro becoming Edinboro State College in 1960. Continued development of undergraduate liberal arts programs and advanced graduate degrees earned Edinboro university status in 1983. 
In July 2021, the university was officially merged with fellow Western Pennsylvania institutions Clarion University of Pennsylvania and California University of Pennsylvania. On October 14, 2021, the state officially adopted the new name of the combined universities: Pennsylvania Western University.

Campus 
The main campus has 42 buildings on a  campus which includes a  lake, open fields and woods, 11 on-campus residence halls (Highlands 1~8, Rose Hall and Earp Hall (used for summer sports camps) and Towers (only one being used currently)) for approximately 2,500 students, and the seven-story Baron-Forness Library. Edinboro University offers 150 degree programs and 57 minors. The student-faculty ratio is 18:1.

In 2007 the university announced a plan to build dormitories for $115 million. The Highland Complex had eight halls, with the first four beginning operations in 2008 and 2009 and the remainder doing so in 2010 and 2011. They opened at a time when enrollment peaked. By 2022 enrollment had sharply declined and Edinboro University was merging with other universities. That year the university announced that Buildings 7 and 8 of the Highland Complex were to be sold; at the time the two buildings had no students.

Athletics 

Edinboro University offers 17 varsity sports: women's basketball, cross country, lacrosse, volleyball, swimming, soccer, softball, tennis, and indoor and outdoor track and field, and men's football, wrestling, cross country,  basketball, swimming, tennis, wheelchair basketball and outdoor track and field. All but the wrestling and wheelchair basketball are NCAA Division II programs and members of the Pennsylvania State Athletic Conference. Wrestling competes on the NCAA Division I level, and as of the 2019 season will no longer actively compete against Division II level PSAC wrestling programs as a result of their new affiliation with the  Mid-American Conference in wrestling. Its wheelchair basketball team competes in the NWBA Intercollegiate Division.

Notable alumni 

Jack R. Anderson, former director of the University of Pittsburgh bands
Leo Bemis, former head coach of the University of Pittsburgh men's soccer team, 1954-1983
Ryan Bizzarro, member of the Pennsylvania House of Representatives, 2013–present
Jim Booros, an American professional golfer who played full-time on the PGA Tour for nine years
Karl Boyes, former member of Pennsylvania House of Representatives, 1981-2003
Samuel Myron Brainerd, U.S. Congressman from Pennsylvania, 1883-1885
Shawn Bunch, All-American wrestler and MMA fighter
Adda Burch, teacher, missionary, temperance activist, reporter
Robert Carothers, President of University of Rhode Island, 1991-2009
Henry Alden Clark, U.S. Congressman from Pennsylvania, 1917-1919
Mark Corey, professional baseball player
Kathy Dahlkemper, U.S. Congresswoman from Pennsylvania, 2009-2011
Denayne Davidson-Dixon, former Arena Football League player
Jakim Donaldson (born 1983), basketball player in the Israeli Basketball Premier League
Mari K. Eder, United States Army Major General (retired)
John Evans, former sportscaster at WJET-TV in Erie, PA, former representative in Pennsylvania House of Representatives
Dave Filoni, American film writer, and animator; director of Star Wars: The Clone Wars film and series
Teresa Forcier, member of Pennsylvania House of Representatives, 1991-2006
LaToya Ruby Frazier, photographer, Guggenheim Fellow, MacArthur Fellow
Gregor Gillespie, NCAA Champion wrestler; professional Mixed Martial Artist in the UFC
David Green, former NFL and CFL football player
Trevor Harris, former NFL player for the Jacksonville Jaguars and starting quarterback in the CFL for the Montreal Alouettes
James T. Harris III, President of University of San Diego, former president of Widener University and Defiance College
Merritt Eldred Hoag, former president of University of North Georgia
Richard Holmes, professional football player
Chris Honeycutt, All-American wrestler; professional MMA fighter for Bellator MMA
Josephine Brawley Hughes, early women's rights advocate
L. C. Hughes, newspaper  editor, lawyer, union organizer, and politician  who served as the eleventh Governor of Arizona Territory
 Bill Jacobs, biologist who made genetic engineering of mycobacteria including tuberculosis possible.
Kenneth Jadlowiec, member of Pennsylvania House of Representatives, 1987-2002
Mike Kelly, football coach for numerous NCAA, CFL, and NFL teams
Miles Brown Kitts, Mayor of Erie, Pennsylvania (1916-1924), Pennsylvania State Senator 1924-1932
Josh Koscheck, NCAA D-1 Wrestling Champion; professional mixed martial artist, former UFC Welterweight Contender
Pat Monahan, lead singer of alternative-rock band Train
Andrew Muldoon, retired professional pair skater
Rajee Narinesingh, transgender actress, activist, author, singer, and reality television personality
Sean O'Brien, former member of Ohio House of Representatives, 2011–2016, former member of Ohio Senate 2016-2020
Jeremy O'Day, General Manager & Vice President of Football Operations, Saskatchewan Roughriders, former Canadian Football League player, Toronto Argonauts and Saskatchewan Roughriders
Joseph Newton Pew, founder of Sun Oil Company, now Sunoco
Frank Polaski, former member of the Pennsylvania House of Representatives, 1964-1970
Dr. Sian Proctor, Inspiration4 Astronaut, first black female pilot on a spacecraft
Tara Seibel, cartoonist, graphic designer, and illustrator
R. Tracy Seyfert, Member of the Pennsylvania House of Representatives 1997-2000
Milton William Shreve, U.S. Congressman from Pennsylvania, 1913–1915,1919–1933
Keith Skelton, former member of Oregon House of Representatives, 1957–1973
Danny Smith, Pittsburgh Steelers' Special Teams Coordinator
David Steadman, curator of ornithology at the Florida Museum of Natural History at the University of Florida
Sharon Stone, actress (attended briefly; honored with honorary degree in 2006)
Laura Temple, missionary teacher and archaeologist based in Mexico
Vicki Van Meter, Youngest female pilot to cross the continental United States
Justin Wilcox, professional mixed martial artist formerly competing in Strikeforce, currently fighting for Bellator
John Williams, CFL football player
Mike S. Zafirovski, former CEO of Nortel Networks and former president of Motorola

References

External links 
Official website
Official athletics website

 
Educational institutions established in 1857
Universities and colleges in Erie County, Pennsylvania
1857 establishments in Pennsylvania
Public universities and colleges in Pennsylvania